The Walnut River is a tributary of the Arkansas River,  long, in the Flint Hills region of Kansas in the United States.  Via the Arkansas, it is part of the Mississippi River watershed.

According to the GNIS, the river has also been known in the past as the "Little Verdigris River".

Course
The Walnut River rises in northern Butler County and flows generally southward through Butler and Cowley Counties, past the towns of El Dorado, Augusta, Winfield and Douglass. It joins the Arkansas River at Arkansas City. The Walnut's principal tributaries are the Whitewater River, which joins it at Augusta, and the Little Walnut River, which joins it in southern Butler County. The Walnut River drainage basin comprises  in an ecoregion characterized by rocky, rolling hills and prairie. Average precipitation, mostly summer rainfall, varies from  annually. Tallgrass prairie is the most common vegetation, covering 66 percent of the land. Crop land covers 23 percent and woodlands cover five percent. Major crops are wheat, soybeans, cotton, hay, sorgum, and corn. Cattle are the most important livestock.

Upstream of El Dorado, a U.S. Army Corps of Engineers dam causes the river to form El Dorado Lake, along which a Kansas state park has been designated. Both lakes offer recreational opportunities including fishing, boating, hunting, camping, and wildlife observation.

In Winfield, the east side of the old Tunnel Mill Dam is a public fishing spot. It is staged directly near the old Kickapoo Corral. The west side of the dam and the Kickapoo Corral are both privately owned and closed to the public. A whirlpool is created by a hole in solid limestone about  down on the river bed directly off the cliffs of the Corral. The bottom is sandy and somewhat rocky.

Historical sites
Near the mouth of the Walnut River, in eastern Arkansas City, are a large number of archaeological sites, including the historical city of Etzanoa, a Wichita settlement that flourished between 1450 and 1700 and housed perhaps 20,000 people. This site was visited in 1601 by New Mexico governor Juan de Oñate.

Festival
The Walnut Valley Festival is held along the banks in Winfield.

See also
List of Kansas rivers

Sources

Columbia Gazetteer of North America entry
DeLorme (2003).  Kansas Atlas & Gazetteer.  Yarmouth, Maine: DeLorme.  .

External links
Corps of Engineers' El Dorado Lake website
El Dorado State Park website

Rivers of Kansas
Rivers of Butler County, Kansas
Rivers of Cowley County, Kansas